Baxışlı (also, Bakhshily and Bakhshyly) is a village and municipality in the Khizi Rayon of Azerbaijan.  It has a population of 315.  The municipality consists of the villages of Baxışlı, Bəyəhmədyurd, Vərdağ, and Güneyqışlaq.

References 

Populated places in Khizi District